The Counter is a high-end casual dining restaurant chain in the United States, Mexico, Ireland, Saudi Arabia, Ghana, and Japan offering custom-topped gourmet burgers with over a million possible burger and burgers-in-a-bowl combinations through a checklist-style menu.

History
The Counter was founded in Santa Monica, California, United States in 2003 by Jeff Weinstein.

Recognition
The Counter was launched into the public eye when Gayle King mentioned it on The Oprah Winfrey Show on February 24, 2006,  It has also been listed as number 15 on Alan Richman's The 20 Hamburgers You Must Eat Before You Die in GQ Magazine.

In the August 14, 2005 issue, Nation's Restaurant News named The Counter as one of "2008's Six Hottest Concepts."

Locations
At 45 units, The Counter is a mostly full-service, build-your-own burger concept. As of 2016, the company was also growing a fast-casual sister concept called BUILT Custom Burgers, with six locations in the US, one in Canada, and one in Ghana.

See also

 List of hamburger restaurants

References

External links
The Counter official website
BUILT Custom Burgers official website

2003 establishments in California
Fast casual restaurants
Fast-food chains of the United States
Hamburger restaurants
Restaurants established in 2003